Constanze Manziarly (14 April 1920 – disappeared 2 May 1945) was born in Innsbruck, Austria. She served as a cook and dietitian to Adolf Hitler until his final days in Berlin in 1945.

Early life
Manziarly was born in Innsbruck, Austria, on 14 April 1920.

Career
Manziarly began working as cook and dietitian for Hitler from his 1943 stays at the Berghof until his death in Berlin on 30 April 1945. Hitler took up residence in the Führerbunker on 16 January 1945. The Reich Chancellery bunker complex in Berlin was made up of two bunkers, the lower Führerbunker and the older upper bunker, known as the Vorbunker. Two rooms in the Vorbunker were used for food supply. Another room was made up of the kitchen which had a refrigerator and a wine store. Manziarly used the kitchen to prepare Hitler's meals while he stayed in the Führerbunker.

Together with Gerda Christian and Traudl Junge, Manziarly was personally requested by Hitler to leave the bunker complex on 22 April. However, all three women volunteered to stay with the dictator until his death, and he apparently gave each of them a cyanide capsule to take should they decide to end their own lives.

Manziarly left the bunker complex on 1 May in a break-out group led by SS-Brigadeführer Wilhelm Mohnke. Evading the Soviet Red Army troops, they made their way north to a German Army hold-out in the cellar of the Schultheiss-Patzenhofer Brewery on the Prinzenallee. The group included Dr. Ernst-Günther Schenck, Gerda Christian, Else Krüger, and Traudl Junge. Early on 2 May, the German group was captured by Soviet soldiers. Mohnke tasked the four women with trying to deliver his written report to Hitler's successor, Karl Dönitz. The women walked out of the brewery courtyard and made their way into the Soviet occupied area of Berlin. The women split up, with Christian and Krueger waiting at a water supply area. Manziarly, whom Junge thought looked like "the ideal image of Russian femininity, well built and plump-cheeked", was wearing a Wehrmacht jacket, and went to find some civilian clothes while Junge waited for her. Junge next saw Manziarly being taken towards a U-Bahn subway tunnel by two Soviet soldiers; she reassured Junge that "They want to see my papers." Manziarly was never heard from again.

Portrayal in the media
Constanze Manziarly has been portrayed by the following actresses in film and television productions:
 Phyllida Law in the 1973 British film Hitler: The Last Ten Days.
 Carole Boyd in the 1973 British television production The Death of Adolf Hitler.
 Pam St. Clement in the 1981 American film The Bunker.
 Bettina Redlich in the 2004 German film ''Downfall (Der Untergang).

See also 
List of people who disappeared

References

1920 births
1940s missing person cases
Austrian chefs
Dietitians
Austrian civilians killed in World War II
Missing people
Missing person cases in Germany
People from Innsbruck
Personal staff of Adolf Hitler
Women in World War II